Hindi Zahra (Tamazight: ⵀⵉⵏⴷⵉ ⵣⴰⵀⵕⴰ, Arabic: هندي زهرة, born 20 January 1979 in Khouribga, Morocco) is a Moroccan singer. When coming up with a stage name, she simply inverted her birth name. Her songs are mostly in English but some lyrics as in the song "Imik Si Mik" are in the Berber Shilha language.

Influenced by singers like Cheikha Rimitti and Umm Kulthum Hindi Zahra has drawn comparisons with Beth Gibbons of Portishead, Billie Holiday, Patti Smith, and Norah Jones.

Career
Zahra was raised by her mother, a dancer and actress, in Khouribga, Morocco. At the age of fifteen, she left school and moved to Paris to live with her father, who had been a soldier. At age 18 she worked at the Louvre.

Zahra wrote her first lyrics and melodies. She is a self-taught multi-instrumentalist. By 2005 she had written about 50 songs of which Beautiful Tango, Oursoul, Try, and Stand Up were first released on the EP Hindi Zahra in 2009 and eleven songs were recorded on Hindi Zahra's first album which was released in January 2010 at the Jazz label Blue Note Records. The video to the opening song Beautiful Tango was made by French director Tony Gatlif. The song Stand Up was chosen for a commercial campaign by Western Union. In June 2010 she collaborated with French musician Blundetto on his debut album Bad Bad Things. In November 2010, Hindi Zahra won the Prix Constantin for Best Album. In February 2011, she won the Victoires de la Musique award for the best World music album.

In 2014 she had roles in the films The Narrow Frame of Midnight by Tala Hadid and in The Cut by Fatih Akin.

In April 2015 her second studio album Homeland was released.

Discography

Albums

Others
2011: Handmade Deluxe Edition (with previously unreleased songs)

EPs
2009: Hindi Zahra (EP)
2011: Until the Next Journey (EP)

Singles

*Did not appear in the official Belgian Ultratop 50 charts, but in the Ultratip charts.

Other releases
2010: "Stand Up"
2010: "Imik Si Mik"
2011: "Fascination

References

External links

Official website
CD review of Handmade by The Guardian

1979 births
Living people
English-language singers from France
21st-century Moroccan women singers
Moroccan emigrants to France
Shilha people
21st-century French women singers
French people of Shilha descent